This is a list of foreign ministers in 2008.

Africa
 Algeria - Mourad Medelci (2007-2013)
 Angola -
João Bernardo de Miranda (1999-2008)
Assunção dos Anjos (2008-2010)
 Benin -
Moussa Okanla (2007-2008)
Jean-Marie Ehouzou (2008-2011)
 Botswana -
Mompati Merafhe (1994-2008)
Phandu Skelemani (2008–2014)
 Burkina Faso -
Djibril Bassolé (2007-2008)
Alain Bédouma Yoda (2008-2011)
 Burundi - Antoinette Batumubwira (2005-2009)
 Cameroon - Henri Eyebe Ayissi (2007-2011)
 Cape Verde -
Víctor Borges (2004-2008)
José Brito (2008-2011)
 Central African Republic -
Côme Zoumara (2006-2008)
Dieudonné Kombo Yaya (2008-2009)
 Chad -
Ahmad Allam-Mi (2005-2008)
Moussa Faki (2008–2017)
 Comoros - Ahmed Ben Said Jaffar (2006-2010)
 Republic of Congo - Basile Ikouébé (2007–2015)
 Democratic Republic of Congo -
Antipas Mbusa Nyamwisi (2007-2008)
Alexis Thambwe Mwamba (2008-2012)
 Côte d'Ivoire - Youssouf Bakayoko (2006-2010)
 Djibouti - Mahamoud Ali Youssouf (2005–present)
 Egypt - Ahmed Aboul Gheit (2004-2011)
 Equatorial Guinea - Pastor Micha Ondó Bile (2003-2012)
 Eritrea - Osman Saleh Mohammed (2007–present)
 Ethiopia - Seyoum Mesfin (1991-2010)
 Gabon -
Jean Ping (1999-2008)
Laure Olga Gondjout (2008)
Paul Toungui (2008-2012)
 The Gambia -
Crispin Grey-Johnson (2007-2008)
Omar Touray (2008-2009)
 Ghana - Akwasi Osei-Adjei (2007-2009)
 Guinea -
Kabèlè Abdoul Camara (2007-2008)
Amadou Lamarana Bah (2008-2009)
 Guinea-Bissau - Maria da Conceição Nobre Cabral (2007-2009)
 Kenya -
Raphael Tuju (2005-2008)
Moses Wetangula (2008-2012)
 Lesotho - Mohlabi Tsekoa (2007–2015)
 Liberia - Olubanke King-Akerele (2007-2010)
 Libya - Abdel Rahman Shalgham (2000-2009)
 Madagascar - Marcel Ranjeva (2002-2009)
 Malawi - Joyce Banda (2006-2009)
 Mali -  Moctar Ouane (2004-2011)
 Mauritania -
Mohamed Saleck Ould Mohamed Lemine (2007-2008)
Cheikh El Avia Ould Mohamed Khouna (2008)
Abdallahi Hassen Ben Hmeida (2008)
Mohamed Mahmoud Ould Mohamedou (2008-2009)
 Mauritius -
Madan Dulloo (2005-2008)
Navin Ramgoolam (acting) (2008)
Arvin Boolell (2008–2014)
 Morocco - Taieb Fassi Fihri (2007-2012)
 Western Sahara - Mohamed Salem Ould Salek (1998–present)
 Mozambique -
Alcinda Abreu (2005-2008)
Oldemiro Balói (2008–2017)
 Namibia - Marco Hausiku (2004-2010)
 Niger - Aïchatou Mindaoudou (2001-2010)
 Nigeria - Ojo Maduekwe (2007-2010)
 Rwanda -
Charles Murigande (2002-2008)
Rosemary Museminari (2008-2009)
 São Tomé and Príncipe -
Ovídio Manuel Barbosa Pequeno (2007-2008)
Carlos Tiny (2008-2010)
 Senegal - Cheikh Tidiane Gadio (2000-2009)
 Seychelles - Patrick Pillay (2005-2009)
 Sierra Leone - Zainab Bangura (2007-2010)
 Somalia -
Muhammad Ali Hamoud (2007-2008)
Ali Ahmed Jama Jangali (2008-2009)
 Somaliland - Abdillahi Mohamed Duale (2006-2010)
 Puntland - Ali Abdi Aware (2007-2008)
 South Africa - Nkosazana Dlamini-Zuma (1999-2009)
 Sudan - Deng Alor (2007-2010)
 Swaziland -
Moses Mathendele Dlamini (2006-2008)
Lutfo Dlamini (2008-2011)
 Tanzania – Bernard Membe (2007–2015)
 Togo -
Léopold Gnininvi (2007-2008)
Kofi Esaw (2008-2010)
 Tunisia - Abdelwahab Abdallah (2005-2010)
 Uganda - Sam Kutesa (2005–2021)
 Western Sahara - Mohamed Salem Ould Salek (1998–2023)
 Zambia - Kabinga Pande (2007-2011)
 Zimbabwe - Simbarashe Mumbengegwi (2005–2017)

Asia
 Afghanistan - Rangin Dadfar Spanta (2006-2010)
 Armenia -
Vartan Oskanian (1998-2008)
Eduard Nalbandyan (2008–2018)
 Azerbaijan - Elmar Mammadyarov (2004–2020)
 Nagorno-Karabakh - Georgy Petrosyan (2005-2011)
 Bahrain - Sheikh Khalid ibn Ahmad Al Khalifah (2005–2020)
 Bangladesh – Iftekhar Ahmed Chowdhury (2007-2009)
 Bhutan -
Yeshey Dorji (acting) (2007-2008)
Ugyen Tshering (2008-2013)
 Brunei - Pengiran Muda Mohamed Bolkiah (1984–2015)
 Cambodia - Hor Namhong (1998–2016)
 China - Yang Jiechi (2007-2013)
 East Timor - Zacarias da Costa (2007-2012)
 Georgia -
Gela Bezhuashvili (2005-2008)
Davit Bakradze (2008)
Ekaterine Tkeshelashvili (2008)
Grigol Vashadze (2008-2012)
 Abkhazia - Sergei Shamba (2004-2010)
 South Ossetia - Murat Dzhioyev (1998-2012)
 India - Pranab Mukherjee (2006-2009)
 Indonesia - Hassan Wirajuda (2001-2009)
 Iran - Manouchehr Mottaki (2005-2010)
 Iraq - Hoshyar Zebari (2003–2014)
 Kurdistan - Falah Mustafa Bakir (2006–2019)
 Israel - Tzipi Livni (2006-2009)
 Palestinian Authority - Riyad al-Maliki (2007–present)
 Japan -
Masahiko Kōmura (2007-2008)
Hirofumi Nakasone (2008-2009)
 Jordan - Salah Bashir (2007-2009)
 Kazakhstan – Marat Tazhin (2007-2009)
 North Korea - Pak Ui-chun (2007-2014)
 South Korea -
Song Min-soon (2006-2008)
Yu Myung-hwan (2008-2010)
 Kuwait - Sheikh Mohammad Sabah Al-Salem Al-Sabah (2003-2011)
 Kyrgyzstan - Ednan Karabayev (2007-2009)
 Laos - Thongloun Sisoulith (2006–2016)
 Lebanon - 
Fawzi Salloukh (2005-2009)
Tarek Mitri (acting) (2006-2008)
 Malaysia -
Syed Hamid Albar (1999-2008)
Rais Yatim (2008-2009)
 Maldives -
Abdullah Shahid (2007-2008)
Ahmed Shaheed (2008-2011)
 Mongolia -
Sanjaasürengiin Oyuun (2007-2008)
Sükhbaataryn Batbold (2008-2009)
 Myanmar - Nyan Win (2004-2011)
 Nepal -
Sahana Pradhan (2007-2008)
Upendra Yadav (2008-2009)
 Oman - Yusuf bin Alawi bin Abdullah (1982–3030)
 Pakistan -
Inam-ul-Haq (2007-2008)
Shah Mehmood Qureshi (2008-2011)
 Philippines - Alberto Romulo (2004-2011)
 Qatar - Sheikh Hamad bin Jassim bin Jaber Al Thani (1992-2013)
 Saudi Arabia - Prince Saud bin Faisal bin Abdulaziz Al Saud (1975–2015)
 Singapore - George Yeo (2004-2011)
 Sri Lanka - Rohitha Bogollagama (2007-2010)
 Syria - Walid Muallem (2006–2020)
 Taiwan -
James C. F. Huang (2006-2008)
Francisco Ou (2008-2009)
 Tajikistan - Khamrokhon Zaripov (2006-2013)
 Thailand -
Nitya Pibulsonggram (2006-2008)
Noppadon Pattama (2008)
Tej Bunnag (2008)
Saroj Chavanavirat (2008)
Sompong Amornwiwat (2008)
Kasit Piromya (2008-2011)
 Turkmenistan - Raşit Meredow (2001–present)
 United Arab Emirates - Sheikh Abdullah bin Zayed Al Nahyan (2006–present)
 Uzbekistan - Vladimir Norov (2006-2010)
 Vietnam - Phạm Gia Khiêm (2006-2011)
 Yemen - Abu Bakr al-Qirbi (2001-2014)

Europe
 Albania - Lulzim Basha (2007-2009)
 Andorra - Meritxell Mateu i Pi (2007-2009)
 Austria - 
Ursula Plassnik (2004-2008)
Michael Spindelegger (2008-2013)
 Belarus - Sergei Martynov (2003-2012)
 Belgium - Karel De Gucht (2004-2009)
 Brussels-Capital Region - Guy Vanhengel (2000-2009)
 Flanders -
 Geert Bourgeois (2004-2008)
 Kris Peeters (2008–2014)
 Wallonia - Marie-Dominique Simonet (2004-2009)
 Bosnia and Herzegovina - Sven Alkalaj (2007-2012)
 Bulgaria - Ivailo Kalfin (2005-2009)
 Croatia -
Kolinda Grabar-Kitarović (2005-2008)
Gordan Jandroković (2008-2011)
 Cyprus -
Erato Kozakou-Marcoullis (2007-2008)
Markos Kyprianou (2008-2011)
 Northern Cyprus - Turgay Avcı (2006-2009)
 Czech Republic - Karel Schwarzenberg (2007-2009)
 Denmark - Per Stig Møller (2001-2010)
 Greenland -
 Aleqa Hammond (2007-2008)
 Per Berthelsen (2008-2009)
 Faroe Islands -
 Høgni Hoydal (2008)
 Jørgen Niclasen (2008-2011)
 Estonia - Urmas Paet (2005–2014)
 Finland -
Ilkka Kanerva (2007-2008)
Alexander Stubb (2008-2011)
 France - Bernard Kouchner (2007-2010)
 Germany - Frank-Walter Steinmeier (2005-2009)
 Greece - Dora Bakoyannis (2006-2009)
 Hungary - Kinga Göncz (2006-2009)
 Iceland - Ingibjörg Sólrún Gísladóttir (2007-2009)
 Ireland -
Dermot Ahern (2004-2008)
Micheál Martin (2008-2011)
 Italy -
Massimo D'Alema (2006-2008)
Franco Frattini (2008-2011)
 Latvia - Māris Riekstiņš (2007-2010)
 Liechtenstein - Rita Kieber-Beck (2005-2009)
 Lithuania -
Petras Vaitiekūnas (2006-2008)
Vygaudas Ušackas (2008-2010)
 Luxembourg - Jean Asselborn (2004–present)
 Macedonia - Antonio Milošoski (2006-2011)
 Malta -
Michael Frendo (2004-2008)
Tonio Borg (2008-2012)
 Moldova - Andrei Stratan (2004-2009)
 Transnistria -
Valeriy Litskai (2000-2008)
Vladimir Yastrebchak (2008-2012)
 Monaco -
Jean Pastorelli (2007-2008)
Franck Biancheri (2008-2011)
 Montenegro - Milan Roćen (2006-2012)
 Netherlands - Maxime Verhagen (2007-2010)
 Norway - Jonas Gahr Støre (2005-2012)
 Poland - Radosław Sikorski (2007–2014)
 Portugal - Luís Amado (2006-2011)
 Romania -
Adrian Cioroianu (2007-2008)
Lazăr Comănescu (2008)
Cristian Diaconescu (2008-2009)
 Russia - Sergey Lavrov (2004–present)
 San Marino -
Fiorenzo Stolfi (2006-2008)
Antonella Mularoni (2008-2012)
 Serbia - Vuk Jeremić (2007-2012)
 Kosovo - Skënder Hyseni (2008-2010)
 Slovakia - Ján Kubiš (2006-2009)
 Slovenia -
Dimitrij Rupel (2004-2008)
Samuel Žbogar (2008-2012)
 Spain - Miguel Ángel Moratinos (2004-2010)
 Sweden - Carl Bildt (2006–2014)
 Switzerland - Micheline Calmy-Rey (2003-2011)
 Turkey - Ali Babacan (2007-2009)
 Ukraine - Volodymyr Ohryzko (2007-2009)
 United Kingdom - David Miliband (2007-2010)
 Scotland - Linda Fabiani (2007-2009)
 Vatican City - Archbishop Dominique Mamberti (2006–2014)

North America and the Caribbean
 Antigua and Barbuda - Baldwin Spencer (2005–2014)
 The Bahamas - Brent Symonette (2007-2012)
 Barbados -
Dame Billie Miller (1994-2008)
Christopher Sinckler (2008)
Maxine McClean (2008–2018)
 Belize
Lisa Shoman (2007-2008)
Wilfred Elrington (2008–2020)
 Canada -
Maxime Bernier (2007-2008)
David Emerson (2008)
Lawrence Cannon (2008-2011)
 Quebec -
 Monique Gagnon-Tremblay (2003-2008)
 Pierre Arcand (2008-2010)
 Costa Rica - Bruno Stagno Ugarte (2006-2010)
 Cuba - Felipe Pérez Roque (1999-2009)
 Dominica -
Roosevelt Skerrit (2007-2008)
Vince Henderson (2008-2010)
 Dominican Republic - Carlos Morales Troncoso (2004–2014)
 El Salvador -
Francisco Laínez (2004-2008)
Marisol Argueta de Barillas (2008-2009)
 Grenada -
Elvin Nimrod (2000-2008)
Peter David (2008-2010)
 Guatemala -
Gert Rosenthal (2006-2008)
Haroldo Rodas (2008-2012)
 Haiti -
Jean Rénald Clérismé (2006-2008)
Alrich Nicolas (2008-2009)
 Honduras -
Milton Jiménez (2006-2008)
Ángel Edmundo Orellana (2008-2009)
 Jamaica - Kenneth Baugh (2007-2012)
 Mexico - Patricia Espinosa (2006-2012)
 Netherlands Antilles - Emily de Jongh-Elhage (2006-2010)
 Nicaragua - Samuel Santos López (2007–2017)
 Panama - Samuel Lewis Navarro (2004-2009)
 Puerto Rico – Fernando Bonilla (2005–2009)
 Saint Kitts and Nevis -
Timothy Harris (2001-2008)
Denzil Douglas (2008-2010)
 Saint Lucia - Stephenson King (2007-2009)
 Saint Vincent and the Grenadines - Sir Louis Straker (2005-2010)
 Trinidad and Tobago - Paula Gopee-Scoon (2007-2010)
 United States - Condoleezza Rice (2005-2009)

Oceania
 Australia - Stephen Smith (2007-2010)
 Fiji - 
Ratu Epeli Nailatikau (2007-2008)
Frank Bainimarama (2008-2009)
 French Polynesia -
 Oscar Temaru (2007-2008)
 Gaston Flosse (2008)
 Gaston Tong Sang (2008-2009)
 Kiribati - Anote Tong (2003–2016)
 Marshall Islands -
Gerald Zackios (2001-2008)
Tony deBrum (2008-2009)
 Micronesia - Lorin S. Robert (2007–2019)
 Nauru - Kieren Keke (2007-2011)
 New Zealand -
Winston Peters (2005-2008)
Murray McCully (2008–2017)
 Cook Islands - Wilkie Rasmussen (2005-2009)
 Niue -
 Young Vivian (2002-2008)
 Toke Talagi (2008–2020)
 Tokelau - Pio Tuia (2008-2009)
 Palau - Temmy Shmull (2001-2009)
 Papua New Guinea - Sam Abal (2007-2010)
 Samoa - Tuilaepa Aiono Sailele Malielegaoi (1998–2021)
 Solomon Islands - William Haomae (2007-2010)
 Tonga - Sonatane Tu'a Taumoepeau Tupou (2004-2009)
 Tuvalu - Apisai Ielemia (2006-2010)
 Vanuatu -
George Wells (2007-2008)
Pakoa Kaltonga (2008-2009)

South America
 Argentina - Jorge Taiana (2005–2010)
 Bolivia - David Choquehuanca (2006–2017)
 Brazil - Celso Amorim (2003–2011)
 Chile - Alejandro Foxley (2006–2009)
 Colombia -
Fernando Araújo Perdomo (2007–2008)
Jaime Bermúdez (2008–2010)
 Ecuador -
María Isabel Salvador (2007–2008)
Fander Falconí (2008–2010)
 Guyana -
Rudy Insanally (2001–2008)
Carolyn Rodrigues (2008–2015)
 Paraguay -
Rubén Ramírez Lezcano (2006–2008)
Alejandro Hamed (2008–2009)
 Peru - José Antonio García Belaúnde (2006–2011)
 Suriname - Lygia Kraag-Keteldijk (2005–2010)
 Uruguay -
Reinaldo Gargano (2005–2008)
Gonzalo Fernández (2008–2009)
 Venezuela - Nicolás Maduro (2006–2013)

References
http://rulers.org

2008 in international relations
Foreign ministers
2008